Lucan is a two-part British television drama, starring Rory Kinnear, Christopher Eccleston and Catherine McCormack. It portrays the disappearance in 1974 of the Earl of Lucan, following the murder of his children's nanny. It was written by Jeff Pope and directed by Adrian Shergold. It was broadcast in December 2013.

Although the drama describes actual events, it also has a fictional element.

Plot 

In 2003, author John Pearson, while researching a book about gambling in high society London, becomes interested in the unexplained disappearance of Lord Lucan in 1974. He pieces the story together through interviews with some of Lucan's contemporaries, notably his family friend, Susie Maxwell-Scott.

In 1974, John Bingham, 7th Earl of Lucan, is a member of the exclusive Clermont Club. The club is owned by John ("Aspers") Aspinall and is frequented by aristocrats and society figures. Lucan spends much of his time gambling at the club, losing heavily and getting into debt.

His gambling causes tensions with his wife, Veronica. Lucan is violent toward Veronica, while telling his friends that she is mentally unstable and it is she who is violent towards him.

After the couple's relationship deteriorates, Lucan moves from the family home to a rented flat. He obtains a court order giving him custody of his three children, having persuaded a judge that Veronica's mental health is putting the children at risk. Veronica succeeds in getting the ruling reversed, but on the condition that she employs a full-time nanny. She hires 29-year old Sandra Rivett.

Lucan continues to harass Veronica, making silent phone calls in the middle of the night and tape-recording conversations with her which he plays back to his friends in an attempt to cast doubts on her mental health.

On the evening of 7 November, Lucan surreptitiously enters the family house and waits in the basement kitchen. He mistakenly believes that Veronica is alone in the house with the children, unaware that Rivett has changed her evening off. When Rivett goes to the kitchen to make tea, Lucan, thinking that she is Veronica, bludgeons her to death.

Veronica goes to the kitchen to look for Rivett. She too is attacked by Lucan but fights him off. With blood streaming from her face, she runs for help to a nearby pub. The police arrive at the house and find Rivett's body.

At 11.35 pm, Lucan arrives at the Maxwell-Scotts' house in Uckfield. He tells Susie Maxwell-Scott his version of the evening's events: that an unknown intruder attacked Veronica; that he (Lucan) fought the intruder off; and that he fled the scene for fear that Veronica would unjustly accuse him of the attack. He leaves the Maxwell-Scotts' house at 1.15 am. This would be the last time that anyone was known to have seen Lord Lucan. The police later find his car abandoned in Newhaven, but there is no sign of Lucan.

On the days following the murder, Aspinall persuades members of the club to close ranks around Lucan and to do whatever they can to protect him.

Seven months later, a coroner's jury determines that Rivett was murdered, naming Lucan as the perpetrator.

In 2003, in a final interview, Susie Maxwell-Scott tells Pearson what she believes happened to Lucan. She pieced the story together from  information provided by her late husband, who was a friend and business associate of Aspinall at the time of the murder. According to Maxwell-Scott's theory, after leaving Uckfield, Lucan telephoned Aspinall to ask for help. Aspinall arranged for Lucan to be taken to France in his (Aspinall's) private boat, and then by car to a remote cottage in Switzerland where Lucan hid for several months. Lucan eventually decided to come home because he wanted to see his children and to clear his name. Aspinall, afraid of what an investigation would reveal about his involvement in the escape, arranged for Lucan to be shot in mid-Channel and his body dumped overboard.

Pearson concludes that Maxwell-Scott's theory is one of the more intriguing ones concerning Lucan's fate, but that's all it could ever be: a theory.

Cast
 Rory Kinnear as John, Earl of Lucan
 Catherine McCormack as Veronica, Countess of Lucan
 Christopher Eccleston as John Aspinall
 Paul Freeman as John Pearson
 Rufus Wright as Younger John Burke
 Rupert Evans as Dominick Elwes
 James Bradshaw as Charlie Benson
 Alan Cox as Ian Maxwell-Scott
 Ann Bell as Mary, Lady Osborne
 Anna Walton as Jane Aspinall
 Michael Gambon as Older John Burke
 Alistair Petrie as Jimmy Goldsmith
 Aleksander Mikic as Ulrich
 Jane Lapotaire as Older Susie Maxwell-Scott
 Helen Bradbury as Younger Susie Maxwell-Scott
 Olivia Llewellyn as Kiki
 Ruth McCabe as Nanny Roberts
 Gemma Jones as Kaitlin, Dowager Countess of Lucan
 Andrew Woodall as Bill Shand-Kydd
 Claudia Harrison as Christine Shand-Kydd
 Stuart Organ as Mr Justice Rees
 Miles Richardson as Bryan Coles
 Leanne Best as Sandra Rivett
 Annabel Mullion as Annabel Birley
 Roger Alborough as Whitehouse
 Robert Horwell as Sergeant Donald Baker
 Michael Gould as Detective Chief Superintendent Roy Ranson
 Cavan Clerkin as Detective Chief Inspector David Gerring
 Michael Marcus as James Fox
 Stephen Churchett as Albert Hensby
 John Warnaby as Dr Gavin Thurston
 Julian Firth as Michael Eastham QC
 Tim Bentinck as Ludovic Kennedy
 Lydia Leonard as Melissa
 Benjamin Dilloway as Tremayne Rodd

Reception

Critical response 
Lucan received generally positive reviews in the British press, with the lead actors singled out for praise. Sameer Rahim, writing in the Telegraph, said that "Rory Kinnear played [Lucan] superbly: emotionally repressed, pinched and prone to sudden violence." Sam Wollaston, in The Guardian, praised what he called the "extraordinary performances" of Kinnear, Eccleston and McCormack.

In The Independent, Sarah Hughes wrote: "Rory Kinnear perfectly caught Lucan's ponderous charm, making you see why women such as Susie Maxwell-Scott might have covered up for him simply by dint of his birth, while there were strong performances from Jane Lapotaire as the older Susie, Leanne Best as Rivett and, in particular, Catherine McCormack as poor beleaguered Veronica." But Hughes also criticised the drama as "murder regurgitated as entertainment", saying that "the real story is the brutal death of Sandra Rivett and there was something wrong about the way she was reduced to a bit part in her own tale. Lucan was a brilliantly acted, cleverly scripted and beautifully shot drama. I'm not sure it should have ever been made."

Lucan and Rivett family members 
Both Lord Lucan’s daughter and Sandra Rivett's son strongly criticised the making of the drama. Rivett's son, Neil Berriman, said in an interview that, "the programme is not entertainment. They are profiting from my mum's death. I can understand interest in certain aspects of the case, but I think depicting the murder is appalling."

Lucan's daughter, Camilla Bingham, said that "the collective Lucan family has never endorsed this drama and I don’t believe that the Rivett family has either. I am not aware that the drama will offer any new insights into the tragic events of 7 November 1974 ... If there were new insights, the proper course would be for the relevant evidence to be submitted to the police, not titivated and presented to the public under the guise of entertainment. ... This drama will not inform or educate and no right-thinking person could regard it as entertainment."

In reply, ITV said that "the drama is not a re-hash of the story but rather seeks to provide a new insight into the events of 7 November 1974 and, crucially, attempts to answer the riddle of what became of Lord Lucan."

References

External links
 

2013 British television series debuts
2013 British television series endings
English-language television shows
Cultural depictions of British men
Television series based on actual events
Films directed by Adrian Shergold